The Tragic Story of Nling is a Canadian short film, directed by Jeffrey St. Jules and released in 2006. The film is set in a fictional city called Capillia, which disposed of its poor citizens by isolating them in a walled compound called Nling, and tells the story of a man (Tom Barnett) and a donkey (voiced by John Neville), who attempt to escape from Nling after becoming its last surviving residents.

St. Jules made the film by shooting live footage, then printing the film out on paper and scanning it to create a jittery animation-like effect.

The film premiered at the 2006 Toronto International Film Festival.

The film was a Canadian Screen Award nominee for Best Live Action Short Drama at the 28th Genie Awards.

References

External links
 

2006 short films
2006 films
Canadian drama short films
Films directed by Jeffrey St. Jules
2000s Canadian films